Francesco Pagano, (fl. 1471–1506) was an Italian painter working primarily in Spain. His date of birth is not known.

Pagano was active in Valencia, and primarily painted religious-themed works for local churches. He is credited with helping import the Italian Renaissance style to Spain. In 1472 he was commissioned in conjunction with Paolo da San Leocadio by the papal envoy Rodrigo Borja, a Spaniard who became Pope Alexander VI, to paint the ceiling of the Valencia Cathedral. A false ceiling had hidden the fresco for more than 330 years, until an investigation into some pigeons led to the discovery. He also painted, in 1506, again in conjunction with Paolo da San Leocadio, the doors of the high altar of the cathedral, with subjects from the Life of the Virgin.

References

 Danilo Morini, John Pius Palaces, Benedict Morini – A painter cheese in Spain – Paolo da San Leocadio; History No. 114 from Reggio, Reggio Emilia 2007

15th-century Spanish painters
Spanish male painters
16th-century Spanish painters
15th-century Italian painters
Italian male painters
Year of birth unknown
Year of death unknown